Mbanika or Banika is an island in Solomon Islands; it is located in the Central Province and is the second largest of the Russell Islands Group. The principal settlement is Yandina.

As portrayed in the HBO miniseries, The Pacific, episode 4 (Gloucester/Pavuvu/Banika), the American forces used the island—referred to in the show as "Banika"—as a hospital and R&R site, during World War II.

During World War II the US built three bases on the island:
Banika Field
Renard Field
Renard Sound Seaplane Base

References

Islands of the Solomon Islands